Lyncourt is a hamlet (and census-designated place) in Onondaga County, New York, United States. The population was 4,250 at the 2010 census.

Lyncourt is in the town of Salina.

Geography
Lyncourt is located at  (43.080266, -76.122450).

Demographics

As of the census of 2000, there were 4,268 people, 1,913 households, and 1,126 families residing in the CDP. The population density was 3,445.9 per square mile (1,328.9/km2). There were 2,009 housing units at an average density of 1,622.0/sq mi (625.5/km2). The racial makeup of the CDP was 94.35% White, 2.84% African American, 0.66% Native American, 0.37% Asian, 0.05% Pacific Islander, 0.40% from other races, and 1.34% from two or more races. Hispanic or Latino of any race were 0.94% of the population.
In the mid to late twentieth century, Lyncourt was the biggest destination for Italian American families looking to migrate to the suburbs. This continued until the early twenty first century, until an eventual slowdown. Still, over 3% of people living in Lyncourt speak both Italian and English, this is greater than 99% of the country. During the early 2000s, Lyncourt was one of the most densely populated Italian American areas in the nation. This culture has greatly influenced the neighborhood, as many families still hold on to their ancestry practices.

There were 1,913 households, out of which 24.0% had children under the age of 18 living with them, 41.8% were married couples living together, 12.5% had a female householder with no husband present, and 41.1% were non-families. 34.8% of all households were made up of individuals, and 15.4% had someone living alone who was 65 years of age or older. The average household size was 2.23 and the average family size was 2.89.

In the CDP, the population was spread out, with 21.0% under the age of 18, 5.6% from 18 to 24, 29.4% from 25 to 44, 21.9% from 45 to 64, and 22.1% who were 65 years of age or older. The median age was 41 years. For every 100 females, there were 90.5 males. For every 100 females age 18 and over, there were 87.3 males.

The median income for a household in the CDP was $32,774, and the median income for a family was $42,105. Males had a median income of $34,044 versus $25,205 for females. The per capita income for the CDP was $18,482. About 6.1% of families and 10.0% of the population were below the poverty line, including 12.7% of those under age 18 and 5.1% of those age 65 or over.

Government
Lyncourt is part of the Town of Salina. The Town is broken up into four wards. Town officials include:
Collen Gunnip, Superviso
Nick Paro, 1st Ward Councilor
Jim Magnarelli, 2nd Ward Councilor
Daniel Ciciarelli, 3rd Ward Councilor
David Carnie, 4th Ward Councilor

Services
Police protection is provided by the Onondaga County Sheriffs Office and the New York State Police. Fire protection is provided by the Lyncourt Volunteer Fire Department. Their fire station is located at 2909 Court Street and is currently being run by Chief Brian Shields. Ambulance service is provided by both EAVES Ambulance and AMR Ambulance.

Education
Lyncourt is part of the Lyncourt Union-Free School District.  This school district serves approximately 420 students in grades K-8.  The school district has agreements with Solvay Union Free School District and East Syracuse Minoa Central School District that allows students from Lyncourt to attend either high school.

References

External links
 Salina Free Library

Hamlets in New York (state)
Syracuse metropolitan area
Census-designated places in Onondaga County, New York
Hamlets in Onondaga County, New York